WUPJ may refer to:

 WUPJ (FM), a radio station (90.9 FM) licensed to serve Escanaba, Michigan, United States
 World Union for Progressive Judaism